Glanrhyd may refer to:

 Glanrhyd, Pembrokeshire, Wales
 Glanrhyd Bridge collapse, the collapse of a railway bridge over the River Towy in 1987 which killed four people on a passenger train
 Glanrhyd Hospital, Pen-y-fai, Bridgend
 , a number of ships with this name